Fereshteh Jan (also Romanized as Fereshteh Jān; also known as Fereshtehjūn and Fereshteh Khān) is a village in Juyom Rural District, Juyom District, Larestan County, Fars Province, Iran. At the 2006 census, its population was 601, in 111 families.

References 

Populated places in Larestan County